The women's 10 metre platform competition of the diving events at the 2019 Pan American Games was held on 3 August at the Aquatics Centre in Lima, Peru.

Schedule

Results
Green denotes finalists

References 

Diving at the 2019 Pan American Games